Anthemountas is a former municipality in Chalkidiki, Greece. Since the 2011 local government reform it has been part of the municipality of Polygyros, of which it is a municipal unit. The municipal unit has an area of 248.956 km2. It population in 2011 was 4,002. The seat of the municipality was in Galatista.

References

Populated places in Chalkidiki